Håkjerringa is an islet on the western coast of Håøya in Kulstadholmane, part of Thousand Islands, an archipelago south of Edgeøya. A large number of Greenland sharks inhabit the waters around the island.

References

 Norwegian Polar Institute Place Names of Svalbard Database

Islands of Svalbard